Since the founding of the Leicester Tigers rugby union club (as Leicester Football Club) in 1880, more than 150 players have represented their national teams while members of the club.

The "position" column lists the position at which the player played in his first international while a member of Leicester Tigers, not necessarily the position for which he is best known; where brackets are used, this indicates an appearance as a replacement. Ben Youngs, for instance, made his debut as a replacement wing but is best known as a scrum-half. The "date first cap obtained" column lists the date of their first cap obtained while at Leicester Tigers not their international debut. JP Pietersen for instance won many international caps for South Africa before joining Leicester.

Sources

Players selected for International rugby
Rugby union-related lists
Leicester-related lists